ACV synthetase (ACVS, L-δ-(α-aminoadipoyl)-L-cysteinyl-D-valine synthetase, N-(5-amino-5-carboxypentanoyl)-L-cysteinyl-D-valine synthase) is an enzyme that catalyzes the chemical reaction

3 ATP + L-2-aminohexanedioate + L-cysteine + L-valine + H2O  3 AMP + 3 PPi + N-[L-5-amino-5-carboxypentanoyl]-L-cysteinyl-D-valine

The five substrates of this enzyme are ATP, L-2-aminohexanedioate, L-cysteine, L-valine, and H2O, whereas its three products are AMP, diphosphate, and N-[L-5-amino-5-carboxypentanoyl]-L-cysteinyl-D-valine.

ACVS is an example of a nonribosomal peptide synthetase (NRPS). It participates in penicillin and cephalosporin biosyntheses.

References

 
 

EC 6.3.2
Enzymes of unknown structure